Aloe globuligemma, commonly known as the witchdoctor's aloe, is a species of flowering plant in the family Asphodelaceae. It is native to southern Africa where it occurs in semi-desert and dry bushland. It is an evergreen, succulent, perennial plant. The plant forms large, dense clumps. It is harvested from the wild for local medicinal use.

Taxonomy 
Aloe globuligemma is a genus in the family Asphodelaceae, subfamily Asphodeloideae. The species derived its name from Latin language globulus meaning "little ball", and gemma, meaning  "bud" referring to the globular flower buds.

Description 
The first description by Illtyd Buller Pole-Evans was published in 1915.

Plant morphology 
Aloe globuligemma grows, building short stems up to  length, forming great, dense clumps by sprouting.

About 20 of the lance shaped leaves form a rosette.

Distribution 

Uses 
Aloe globuligemma is used in traditional African medicine.  A leaf infusion is taken traditionally to for stomach ache, for venereal diseases, and as an abortifacient.

Gallery

References

Bibliography 
 Susan Carter, John Jacob Lavranos, Leonard Eric Newton, Colin C. Walker, Aloes. The definitive guide, Publisher Kew Publishing,Royal Botanic Gardens, Kew, 2011, pages=459
 Leonard Eric Newton, editor Urs Eggli, Aloe globuligemma, Sukkulenten-Lexikon. Einkeimblättrige Pflanzen (Monocotyledonen), Verlag=E, Stuttgart, 2001, | pages=141 (German)
 Massey, Jimmy R.; Murphy, James C. (1996). "Vascular plant systematics". NC Botnet. University of North Carolina at Chapel Hill. Retrieved 19 January 2016.
 R J Ferry. Inflorescences and Their Names. The McAllen International Orchid Society Journal.Vol. 12(6), pp. 4–11 June 2011
 Carter, S., Lavranos, J.J., Newton, L.E. & Walker, C.C. (2011). Aloes, The Definitive Guide Royal Botanic Gardens, Kew  Page 459. (Includes a picture).
 Mapaura, A. & Timberlake, J. (eds) (2004). A checklist of Zimbabwean vascular plants Southern African Botanical Diversity Network Report No. 33 Sabonet, Pretoria and Harare Page 84. 
 Setshogo, M.P. (2005). Preliminary checklist of the plants of Botswana. Sabonet Report no. 37. Sabonet, Pretoria and Gaborone Page 115. 
 West, O. (1974). A Field Guide to the Aloes of Rhodesia. Longman, Salisbury Pages 80 – 84. (Includes a picture).

globuligemma